Whiting House can refer to buildings in the United States, listed by state first, then city/town:

 Lawler-Whiting House, Talladega, in the National Register of Historic Places listings in Talladega County, Alabama
 Whiting Homestead, West Hartford, on the National Register of Historic Places in Hartford County, Connecticut
 Newell A. Whiting House, Onawa, in the National Register of Historic Places listings in Monona County, Iowa
 Samuel Kidder Whiting House, Ellsworth, in the National Register of Historic Places listings in Hancock County, Maine
 Timothy A. Whiting House, Rochester, in the National Register of Historic Places listings in Olmsted County, Minnesota
 Oliver Whiting Homestead, Wilton, in the National Register of Historic Places listings in Hillsborough County, New Hampshire
 Whiting House (Glenville, West Virginia), Glenville, in the National Register of Historic Places listings in West Virginia
 Frank B. Whiting House, Neenah, in the National Register of Historic Places listings in Winnebago County, Wisconsin